The 2007 Penn State Nittany Lions football team represented the Pennsylvania State University in the 2007 NCAA Division I FBS football season. The team was coached by Joe Paterno and played its home games in Beaver Stadium in University Park, Pennsylvania.

The 2006 season began with the Nittany Lions ranked #19 in the AP and Coaches preseason polls. The team dropped out of the rankings with losses to Notre Dame and Ohio State, but finished the season ranked #25 in the Coaches Poll and #24 in the AP Poll with a final record of 9–4.

Preseason
Shortly after the end of the 2006 season, junior linebacker and 2006 Bednarik Award finalist Dan Connor announced he would remain at Penn State for his senior year.

Redshirt junior offensive lineman Elijah Robinson was forced to give up football after being diagnosed with a tight spinal canal, a condition that could lead to paralysis if Robinson ever sustained a head impact that pinches the spinal cord. Redshirt junior safety Spencer Ridenhour chose to transfer from Penn State, after being unable to win a starting position with returning safety Anthony Scirrotto and converted cornerback Tony Davis ahead of him on the depth charts.

Seniors Dan Connor, Terrell Golden, and Anthony Morelli were elected tri-captains by their teammates prior to the season.

Penn State was ranked #17 in the AP and #18 in the Coaches college football preseason polls.

Recruiting class
The Nittany Lions received 21 letters of intent on National Signing Day, February 7, 2007.

Spring practice

The public got their first look at the 2007 squad during the annual Blue-White Game at Beaver Stadium on April 21, a 70-degree sun-splashed day. A record crowd of 71,000 turned out for the scrimmage, the third highest in the nation for a spring football game, and surpassing the previous record of 62,000 set in 1996.

Thousands of fans in the huge crowd wore maroon and orange shirts, in tribute to the victims of the previous week's events at Virginia Tech, including a section of 800 fans that formed a large "VT" block.

The White team defeated the Blue team 30–6, led by junior quarterback Paul Cianciolo who ran for one touchdown and passed for two more, finishing 8-of-9 for 126 yards passing, and sophomore receiver Chris Bell who led all receivers with 116 yards receiving and two touchdowns, including a 74-yard touchdown reception from quarterback Daryll Clark.

Criminal charges
On April 27, 2007, State College police announced that six members of the squad were charged with a range of criminal charges related to an altercation that occurred in an apartment in downtown State College earlier that month. The charges include burglary, criminal trespass, simple assault, and harassment, and players charged include junior safety Anthony Scirrotto, who led the Big Ten in 2006 with six interceptions and was named 2006 first-team All-Big Ten, and junior cornerback Justin King, named second-team All-Big Ten in 2006. 
Charges against King were withdrawn before the preliminary hearing on May 4, 2007. After the hearing, charges against Jerome Hayes, Tyrell Sales and Lydell Sargeant were dismissed, citing weak evidence. However, Scirrotto and Chris Baker still face a possible trial in county court.

Coach Paterno announced that, because of the incident, the entire football team will clean Beaver Stadium on Sundays after home games, a task usually handled by members of Penn State's club sports teams. The team began serving this punishment following their 59–0 victory over Florida International. The players arrived at the stadium just prior to 8:00 a.m. and cleaned eight sections of the stadium. They were joined by members of various sports clubs and teams. The football team and other organizations worked together to clean the entire stadium.

Penn State's Office of Judicial Affairs expelled Scirrotto, Baker, Sargeant and Hayes for the second summer semester, but all four players were allowed to return to campus on August 6 for preseason workouts. Sargeant and his family requested formal Judicial Affairs hearings to appeal the decision.

Charges of burglary, simple assault and criminal solicitation against Scirrotto were subsequently dismissed by Centre County Presiding Judge, Charles C. Brown, Jr., but a felony charge of criminal trespass and a summary offense of harassment are still pending. Trials for Scirrotto and Baker are scheduled for December.

Preseason awards

 Jeremy Boone
Arthur Ashe Jr. Sports Scholars Award
Deon Butler
Second-team Athlon Sports pre-season All-Big Ten
Second-team Sporting News pre-season All-Big Ten
Second-team College Football News pre-season All-Big Ten
 Gerald Cadogan
Arthur Ashe Jr. Sports Scholars Award
Dan Connor
First-team Athlon Sports pre-season All-American
First-team Athlon Sports pre-season All-Big Ten
Second-team Sporting News pre-season All-American
First-team Sporting News pre-season All-Big Ten
Second-team CBS Sports pre-season All-American
College Football News pre-season Defensive Player of the Year
First-team College Football News pre-season All-Big Ten
 Devin Fentress
Arthur Ashe Jr. Sports Scholars Award
Kevin Kelly
Third-team Athlon Sports pre-season All-Big Ten
Justin King
Second-team Athlon Sports pre-season All-Big Ten
Second-team Sporting News pre-season All-Big Ten
First-team College Football News pre-season All-Big Ten
Sean Lee
Third-team Athlon Sports pre-season All-Big Ten
Second-team Sporting News pre-season All-Big Ten
Second-team College Football News pre-season All-Big Ten
Anthony Morelli
Second-team Athlon Sports pre-season All-Big Ten
 Rich Ohrnberger
Second-team Athlon Sports pre-season All-Big Ten
Andrew Quarless
Second-team Athlon Sports pre-season All-Big Ten
Anthony Scirrotto
First-team Sporting News pre-season All-Big Ten
Second-team College Football News pre-season All-Big Ten
 A.J. Wallace
Third-team Athlon Sports pre-season All-Big Ten
Derrick Williams
Second-team Athlon Sports pre-season All-Big Ten
Second-team Sporting News pre-season All-Big Ten
Second-team College Football News pre-season All-American
First-team College Football News pre-season All-Big Ten

Schedule
Penn State did not play Big Ten teams Northwestern and Minnesota this year.

Personnel

Roster

Coaching staff

 Joe Paterno – Head Coach
 Dick Anderson – Offensive Line (Guards and Centers)
 Tom Bradley – Defensive Coordinator and Cornerbacks
 Galen Hall – Offensive Coordinator and Running Backs
 Larry Johnson, Sr. – Defensive Line
 Bill Kenney – Offensive Tackles and Tight Ends
 Mike McQueary – Wide Receivers and Recruiting Coordinator
 Brian Norwood – Safeties
 Jay Paterno – Quarterbacks
 Ron Vanderlinden – Linebackers
 John Thomas – Strength and Conditioning

Coaching changes
Safeties coach Brian Norwood left the staff at the conclusion of the regular season to accept the defensive coordinator position at Baylor. Former Coordinator of Player Personnel Kermit Buggs was named his replacement and assumed coaching duties prior to the Nittany Lions' postseason appearance in the Alamo Bowl.

Game summaries

September 1: Florida International

The Nittany Lions shut out the Golden Panthers in their first-ever meeting. Quarterback Anthony Morelli was 23 of 38 for 295 yards, with touchdown passes to Terrell Golden, Mickey Shuler, Jr., and Matt Hahn. The running backs scored five touchdowns, including two by Austin Scott.

Led by linebackers Dan Connor and Sean Lee, the defensive unit forced five turnovers and held FIU to −3 yards rushing.

Lee was named Big Ten Defensive Player of the Week for his performance.

September 8: Notre Dame

In front of a crowd of 110,078 spectators, the second-largest ever at Beaver Stadium, the Nittany Lions overpowered an inexperienced Fighting Irish team in a 31–10 win. Derrick Williams returned a punt 78 yards for a touchdown to start Penn State's scoring, after the Irish took a 7–0 lead on an interception return for a touchdown. Austin Scott rushed for 116 yards and two touchdowns on 28 carries. Anthony Morelli finished 12 of 21 for 131 yards, including a 51-yard strike to Chris Bell and a 10-yard touchdown to Jordan Norwood.

Led by Dan Connor, the defense sacked the Irish's highly touted freshman quarterback Jimmy Clausen six times for −50 yards. The defensive unit held the Irish to zero rushing yards and just 144 yards total. The Irish committed 14 penalties for 97 yards, partly due to the loud, mostly white-clad crowd.

Recording 12 tackles, Connor was selected Big Ten Defensive Player of the Week as well as Walter Camp National Defensive Player of the Week. Derrick Williams' punt return for a touchdown was selected the week's Pontiac Game Changing Performance in a landslide vote.

September 15: Buffalo

Backup tailback Rodney Kinlaw had his first 100-yard game, tallying a career-high 129 yards on 23 carries and a touchdown after replacing starter Austin Scott, who fumbled on each of Penn State's first two drives. Scott's first fumble at the Penn State 8-yard line allowed the Bulls to take the lead, 3–0.

After a slow start, quarterback Anthony Morelli finished 20 of 27 for 202 yards and a career-high four touchdowns, including two to tight end Andrew Quarless, who was playing in his first game this season after being suspended for an underage drinking citation. Jordan Norwood's acrobatic 5-yard touchdown catch was highlighted as the Top Play for September 15, 2007 on ESPN's SportsCenter.

On defense, Dan Connor and Sean Lee each recorded 12 tackles. Safety Anthony Scirrotto also recorded an interception and recovered a fumble forced by Tony Davis.

September 22: @ Michigan

The Wolverines defeated the Nittany Lions 14–9, their first loss of the season. Michigan's Mike Hart carried the ball a record 44 times for 153 yards, helping the Wolverines control the clock and executed 26 more plays than Penn State.

The Nittany Lions defense permitted only three drives above 40 yards, forced two turnovers and limited Hart to 3.5 yards per carry, but the Wolverines were 10 of 18 on third down conversions. Sean Lee finished with 12 tackles, and cornerback Lydell Sargeant made a career-high 10 tackles including a tackle for loss and an interception.

Anthony Morelli was 15 of 31 for 169 yards, with no touchdowns or interceptions, but lost a fumble early in the game on the Penn State 10-yard line. Michigan needed only two plays to convert the turnover into a touchdown.

September 29: @ Illinois

The Nittany Lions fell 27–20 to the Fighting Illini in a turnover-filled game, Illinois's first win over a ranked opponent since 2001. The Illini would take a 7–3 lead on a 90-yard kickoff return for a touchdown, the first given up by Penn State since 1994.

Quarterback Anthony Morelli was 21 of 38 for a career-high 298 yards but was intercepted three times inside the Illinois 30-yard line. Morelli also had a crucial fumble on a fourth down scramble after appearing to have gained enough yards for the first down. The offense started five drives in Illinois territory but could only score three points on those drives.

The defense struggled early to defend the Illini's option running game, giving up 216 yards rushing. Linebacker Sean Lee recorded a career-high 17 tackles. Justin King and Tony Davis each intercepted the ball once, the second of the season for both players.

October 6: Iowa

Quarterback Anthony Morelli overcame first-half boos from the Beaver Stadium crowd to finish 18 of 31 for 233 yards and a touchdown in a 27–7 win over the Hawkeyes. Rodney Kinlaw, playing in place of suspended tailback Austin Scott, ran for a career-high 168 yards and two touchdowns. Redshirt freshman Evan Royster had 86 yards on 16 carries before leaving the game in the third quarter with an injury.

Placekicker Kevin Kelly connected on 2 of 3 field goals, including a personal-best 53-yarder. Deon Butler led Nittany Lions receivers with 3 catches for 55 yards. Maurice Evans and Aaron Maybin each sacked Iowa's Jake Christensen twice, and the Hawkeyes were held scoreless until Trey Stross caught an 11-yard touchdown pass early in the fourth quarter.

October 13: Wisconsin

Penn State capitalized on early turnovers by the Badgers, including a P.J. Hill fumble on the first play from scrimmage, to take control of the game early.

Quarterback Anthony Morelli completed 16 of 28 passes for 216 yards and a touchdown for the Nittany Lions. Tailbacks Rodney Kinlaw and Evan Royster each scored touchdowns while rushing for 115 and 68, respectively. Wide receiver Deon Butler caught seven passes for 93 yards and a touchdown. Backup quarterback Daryll Clark, who saw playing time in mop-up duty, scored on a 1-yard run. The Penn State defense intercepted Badgers quarterback Tyler Donovan twice. Linebackers Sean Lee and Dan Connor each ended with 12 tackles. The Lions were only penalized once for 10 yards, continuing their streak as the Big Ten's least-penalized team.

Defensive end Jerome Hayes was lost for the season after tearing his ACL in the third quarter.

October 20: @ Indiana

The Penn State defense, despite giving up 386 total yards, forced four second-half Hoosiers turnovers, including two forced fumbles by defensive end Maurice Evans who scooped up one fumble and returned it 55 yards. Although the Hoosiers had the lead early on, the Nittany Lions took the lead in the final minute of the first half. Penn State held off an Indiana comeback in the fourth quarter, ensuring the continuation of their perfect record over the Hoosiers. The win also gave the Nittany Lions their first road win of the year.

On offense, Anthony Morelli finished 22 of 32 for 195 yards, two touchdowns and an interception. Jordan Norwood led all receivers with 8 receptions for 65 yards.

Evans was named Big Ten Defensive Player of the Week. In addition to his two forced fumbles, he also recorded 4.5 tackles for loss and 3.5 sacks.

Defensive tackle Jared Odrick left the game with a broken ankle, and fullback Matt Hahn left with a torn ACL. Both are out for the season.

October 27: Ohio State

ESPN's College GameDay aired from State College, the second time in three seasons the show originated from Happy Valley for the visit by the Buckeyes. After a close first quarter, Ohio State pulled away to win 37–17. First Ohio State scored a field goal, then Penn State scored a touchdown. Ohio State then scored another touchdown to end the quarter 10–7. After another Ohio State touchdown to put the Buckeyes up 17-7, Penn State linebacker Dan Connor intercepted a Todd Boeckman pass, Ohio State's only meaningful possession to not end in a score, to give the Nittany Lions a chance to close the gap before halftime. However, Penn State ended up punting, and the Buckeyes dominated the second half, allowing only a field goal and a late kickoff return touchdown. Ohio State never punted in the game.

November 3: Purdue

In his final Beaver Stadium performance, linebacker Dan Connor made 11 tackles against the Boilermakers to give him 379 career stops and became Penn State's all-time tackler, passing Paul Posluszny (372).

Senior Anthony Morelli was 22 of 35 for 210 yards and a touchdown, giving him 2,060 yards passing for the season. With 2,424 passing yards last season, Morelli became the first Nittany Lion quarterback with at least 2,000 passing yards in multiple seasons.

Redshirt freshman tailback Evan Royster recorded his first career 100-yard rushing game, finishing with 126 yards on 21 carries and a touchdown. Derrick Williams also made a career-high 10 receptions for 95 yards and rushed for 12 yards and a touchdown, finishing with a career-high 151 all-purpose yards.

Linebacker Sean Lee was named Big Ten Co-Defensive Player of the Week. Lee finished with 12 tackles and two forced fumbles, including a game-changing play late in the first quarter. On third-and-goal from the one yard line, Lee stripped and recovered the football to halt a potential Purdue scoring drive.

November 10: @ Temple

Senior tailback Rodney Kinlaw eclipsed the 1,000 yard mark as the Nittany Lions shut out the Owls for the second consecutive year. Kinlaw tied his career-high 168 yards and also caught a career-high five passes for 27 yards.

Anthony Morelli was 22 of 33 for 260 yards with three touchdowns, two of them to Jordan Norwood. Derrick Williams had a game-high seven receptions for a career-high 104 yards, and teammate Deon Butler made five receptions for 43 yards and a touchdown.

The Nittany Lions defense posted its fourth shut-out in 17 games, and its second road shutout in 17 games, dating back to the 12–0 win over Purdue in Ross–Ade Stadium in 2006. The defense was led by Dan Connor who tied his career-high of 18 tackles and Sean Lee who had 10 tackles and a fumble recovery.

For the second time this season, Connor was selected the Walter Camp National Defensive Player of the Week as well as Big Ten Defensive Player of the Week.

November 17: @ Michigan State

The Nittany Lions took a 24–7 lead in the third quarter on kicker Kevin Kelly's 5-yard touchdown run on a fake field goal. However, the Spartans outscored Penn State 28–7 the remainder of the game to take possession of the Land Grant Trophy. Penn State was awarded a 4th timeout in the final minute of the game.

The Nittany Lions defense forced three turnovers and limited the Spartans to 145 rushing yards, but Spartans quarterback Brian Hoyer was 16 of 21 for 257 yards, with four touchdowns and two interceptions. The Spartans had eight pass plays of 20 yards or more, with seven coming in the second half.

Anthony Morelli was 16 of 35 for 188 yards, with one touchdown and no interceptions. However, down 35–31 in the game's final minutes, Morelli threw four consecutive incompletions to end Penn State's last drive.

December 29: 2007 Alamo Bowl – Texas A&M

Penn State rallied from a 14–0 first quarter deficit to win 24–17 on the strength of the running game provided by the offensive line and Rodney Kinlaw, Daryll Clark and Evan Royster. The defense came up with a key goal line stand in the fourth quarter stopping an option play on fourth and goal from inside the five yard line. The comeback from 14–0 has been compared to the 1981 Penn State vs Pittsburgh game where Penn State fell into an early 14–0 hole after one, but came back to win in a 48–14 blowout. In this game, Penn State went on a 24–3 run in the second and third quarters.

Rankings

Awards

Watchlists

Deon Butler
Fred Biletnikoff Award watchlist
Maxwell Award watchlist
Dan Connor
Lombardi Award watchlist and semifinalist
Chuck Bednarik Award watchlist, semifinalist, and finalist
Dick Butkus Award watchlist, semifinalist and finalist
Bronko Nagurski Trophy watchlist
Lott Trophy watchlist
Walter Camp Player of the Year semifinalist
Maurice Evans
Ted Hendricks Award finalist
Justin King
Jim Thorpe Award watchlist
Anthony Morelli
Davey O'Brien Award watchlist
Manning Award watchlist
Andrew Quarless
John Mackey Award watchlist
A. Q. Shipley
Dave Rimington Trophy watchlist
Derrick Williams
Fred Biletnikoff Award watchlist

Players

Jeremy Boone
First-team All-Big Ten
ESPN All-Big Ten Team
Gerald Cadogan
ESPN The Magazine CoSIDA Academic All-District
First-team ESPN The Magazine CoSIDA Academic All-American
Dan Connor
2007 Bednarik Award winner
First-team Walter Camp All-American
First-team Associated Press All-American
First-team ESPN All-American
Second-team Sporting News All-American
First-team Rivals.com All-American
College Football News All-American
First-team Scout.com All-American
Walter Camp Defensive Player of the Week (September 8)
Big Ten Defensive Player of the Week (September 8)
Walter Camp Defensive Player of the Week (November 10)
Big Ten Defensive Player of the Week (November 10)
First-team All-Big Ten
ESPN All-Big Ten Team
Second-team Sports Illustrated mid-season All American
Under Armour Award (Most Valuable Player, 2008 Senior Bowl North team)
Maurice Evans
Third-team Scout.com All-American
Big Ten Defensive Player of the Week (October 20)
First-team All-Big Ten
Justin King
First-team All-Big Ten
Sean Lee
First-team Pro Football Weekly All-American
Big Ten Defensive Player of the Week (September 1)
Big Ten Defensive Player of the Week (November 3)
ESPN The Magazine CoSIDA Academic All-District
Second-team All-Big Ten
ESPN.com All-Bowl Team
Aaron Maybin
Sporting News Freshman All-Big Ten
Anthony Morelli
Big Ten Sportsmanship Award
Jordan Norwood
ESPN The Magazine CoSIDA Academic All-District
Rich Ohrnberger
Second-team All-Big Ten
Evan Royster
Sporting News Freshman All-Big Ten
Mark Rubin
ESPN The Magazine CoSIDA Academic All-District
A. Q. Shipley
First-team All-Big Ten (conference coaches selection)
ESPN All-Big Ten Team
ESPN.com All-Bowl Team
Derrick Williams
Pontiac Game Changing Performance (Sep. 8)
Stefen Wisniewski
Sporting News Freshman All-Big Ten

Post season
Penn State finished the season ranked #25 in the final USA Today college football poll, earning Penn State its 33rd Top 25 finish under Joe Paterno.

Penn State finished second in football attendance for the fifth time this decade and in the top four for the 17th consecutive year, averaging 108,917 for seven home games, including two primetime crowds of 110,134 on October 27 to watch Penn State host Ohio State, the second-largest in Beaver Stadium history, and 110,078 on September 8 to watch Penn State beat Notre Dame, the third-largest in Beaver Stadium history. Penn State finished the season with a sellout crowd of 66,166 at the Alamo Bowl.

In January, junior cornerback Justin King announced that he was going to declare for the 2008 NFL Draft, skipping his final year of eligibility. King had graduated the previous semester with a degree in liberal arts with an emphasis in sports management. According to King's stepfather and high school coach, "He wanted to get an education and a degree from Penn State, which he did. He wanted to help turn Penn State around, and he did that, too."

Three players were invited to the NFL Scouting Combine, held February 20–26 in Indianapolis, Indiana: Dan Connor, Justin King, and Anthony Morelli.

NFL draft
Two Penn State players were selected in the 2008 NFL Draft.

All-star games

References

Penn State
Penn State Nittany Lions football seasons
Alamo Bowl champion seasons
Penn State Nittany Lions football